Wangen District was one of the 26 administrative districts in the canton of Bern, Switzerland. Its capital was the municipality of Wangen an der Aare. The district had an area of 129 km² and consisted of 23 municipalities.  It was dissolved on 31 December 2009 when it and the Aarwangen District became part of the Oberaargau district.

In 2009, the municipalities of Wanzwil and Röthenbach bei Herzogenbuchsee became part of the municipality of Heimenhausen
In 2008 Oberönz became part of Herzogenbuchsee

References

Former districts of the canton of Bern